The 2006 UCLA Bruins football team represented the University of California, Los Angeles (UCLA) in the 2006 NCAA Division I FBS football season.  They played their home games at the Rose Bowl in Pasadena, California and were coached by Karl Dorrell. It was Dorrell's fourth season as the UCLA head coach.  The Bruins finished 7–6 overall, and were fourth in the Pacific-10 Conference with a 5–4 record.

Pre-season

Schedule

Game summaries

Utah

Ben Olson threw for 318 yards and 3 touchdowns, with no sacks. Total rushing for the Bruins was 107 yards.

Rice

Ben Olson passed for 124 yards and 2 touchdowns. He was also sacked 4 times. Chris Markey rushed for 208 yards, and Kahlil Bell rushed for 102.

Washington

UCLA's started the game strong, scoring a field goal on the first drive and then recovering a Washington fumble to score a touchdown.  The next two drives of the first quarter ended with field goals, and UCLA was up at the half 16-7.

Stanford

Eric McNeal blocked a Cardinal punt and returned it for a touchdown in the first quarter. Chane Moline rushed for 3 yards and 2 touchdowns. Justin Medlock kicked a 40-yard field goal in the fourth quarter.  Kenneth Lombard recovered a fumble for a touchdown with 5:13 left in the game.

Arizona

Patrick Cowan passed for 201 yards and 2 touchdowns. Justin Medlock kicked 2 field goals in the third quarter. Al Verner had an 89-yard interception that he returned for a touchdown with 4:19 left in the game.

Oregon

Kahlil Bell rushed for 6 yards and 2 touchdowns.  Patrick Cowan threw for 112 yards, no touchdowns, and was sacked twice.

Notre Dame

Justin Medlock missed a 47-yard field goal in the first quarter, and made a 29-yard field goal in the fourth. William Snead and Marcus Everett both rushed for touchdowns. Patrick Cowan threw for 217 yards, 2 touchdowns, and was sacked 3 times.

Washington State

Patrick Cowan threw for 252 yards and 1 touchdown.

California

Patrick Cowan threw for 329 yards and no touchdowns. Chris Markey rushed for 136 yards and 1 touchdown. Chane Moline and Patrick Cowan also each rushed for a touchdown.

Oregon State

Patrick Cowan threw for 126 yards and 2 touchdowns.  Justin Medlock kicked 4 field goals.

Arizona State

The Bruins became bowl eligible after beating Arizona State.  Patrick Cowan threw for 187 yards and 2 touchdowns, and was sacked 3 times.  Brandon Breazell rushed for 91 yards and 2 touchdowns.

USC

The Bruins beat the Trojans for the first time since 1998, ending the Trojans chance to play in the National Championship game. Patrick Cowan passed for 114 yards and ran for another 55.

Florida State

The Bruins lost to the Seminoles in their first appearance at the Emerald Bowl.  In February 2010, Florida State vacated this win due to NCAA rule violations.

Players

Depth chart

Coaching staff
 Karl Dorrell - head coach - fourth year
 Jim Svoboda - offensive coordinator and quarterbacks'
 DeWayne Walker - defensive coordinator and secondary
 Jim Colletto - assistant head coach and offensive line

References

UCLA
UCLA Bruins football seasons
UCLA Bruins football